Brownea santanderensis is a tree in the family Fabaceae, native to Colombia. It is named for Colombia's Santander Department.

Description
Inflorescences feature flowers with five red petals.

Distribution and habitat
Brownea santanderensis is endemic to Colombia, where it is confined to Santander Department.

References

santanderensis
Endemic flora of Colombia
Plants described in 1995